Park Seong-su (박성수 | born May 12, 1996) is a South Korean football player. He plays for FC Anyang.

Career
Park Seong-su joined J2 League club Ehime FC in 2015.

Club statistics
Updated to 1 January 2020.

References

External links

1996 births
Living people
South Korean footballers
South Korean expatriate footballers
J2 League players
J3 League players
Ehime FC players
FC Gifu players
Daegu FC players
Association football goalkeepers
South Korean expatriate sportspeople in Japan
Expatriate footballers in Japan